Rafael Osuna defeated Frank Froehling 7–5, 6–4, 6–2 in the final to win the men's singles tennis title at the 1963 U.S. National Championships.

Seeds
The seeded players are listed below. Rafael Osuna is the champion; others show the round in which they were eliminated.

 Chuck McKinley (semifinals)
 Roy Emerson (fourth round)
 Dennis Ralston (quarterfinals)
 Rafael Osuna (champion)
 Ken Fletcher (third round)
 Bobby Wilson (quarterfinals)
 Eugene Scott (third round)
 Ham Richardson (third round)

Draw

Key
 Q = Qualifier
 WC = Wild card
 LL = Lucky loser
 r = Retired

Final eight

Earlier rounds

Section 1

Section 2

Section 3

Section 4

Section 5

Section 6

Section 7

Section 8

References

External links
 1963 U.S. National Championships on ITFtennis.com, the source for this draw
 Association of Tennis Professionals (ATP) – 1963 U.S. Championships Men's Singles draw

U.S. National Championships (tennis) by year – Men's singles
Mens Singles